The FL1 (until 2012 FR1) is a regional rail route forming part of the Lazio regional railways network, which is operated by Trenitalia, and converges on the city of Rome, Italy.

The route operates over the infrastructure of the Florence–Rome railway, the Pisa–Livorno–Rome railway and the Rome–Fiumicino railway. Within the territory of the comune of Rome, it plays the role of a commuter railway. It is estimated that on average about 65,000 passengers travel on an FR1 train each day.

The designation FR1 appears only in publicity material (e.g. public transport maps), in the official timetables, and on signs at some stations. The electronic destination boards at stations show only the designation "R1".

Route 

  Orte ↔ Fiumicino Aeroporto

The FL1, a cross-city route, runs from Orte, in the province of Viterbo, in a southerly direction over the Florence–Rome railway as far as Roma Tiburtina.  It then continues, via the Pisa–Livorno–Rome railway east and south of Rome's city centre, to Roma Trastevere.  Finally, it takes the Rome–Fiumicino railway to Fiumicino Aeroporto, in the comune of Fiumicino southwest of the city centre.

History

The first FL1 services between Monterotondo-Mentana and Fiumicino Aeroporto went into operation during 1994, bringing about an increased frequency of services on the lines through Rome.

The route also included hourly trains between Orte and Monterotondo-Mentana.

Until 2000, the FL1 route divided into two sections near Fiumicino: one train in every four branched off to Fiumicino Città, while the remaining services headed towards Fiumicino Aeroporto.

Upon the introduction of the new timetable in 2000, the Fiumicino Città station was officially closed.

On 7 December 2006, the new Fiera di Roma railway station was opened to the public, and included in the FL1 route.

Stations 
The stations on the FL1 are as follows:
 Orte
 Gallese in Teverina
 Civita Castellana-Magliano
 Collevecchio-Poggio Sommavilla
 Stimigliano
 Gavignano Sabino
 Poggio Mirteto
 Fara Sabina-Montelibretti
 Piana Bella di Montelibretti
 Monterotondo-Mentana
 Settebagni (limit of urban service)
 Fidene
 Nuovo Salario
 Val D'Ala
 Roma Nomentana
 Roma Tiburtina  
 Roma Tuscolana  
 Roma Ostiense    
 Roma Trastevere  
 Villa Bonelli
 Magliana
 Muratella
 Ponte Galeria
 Fiera di Roma (limit of urban service)
 Parco Leonardo
 Fiumicino Aeroporto

Scheduling 
The FL1 route is designated in Trenitalia official timetables as M70 Orte–Fara Sabina–Fiumicino FR1.

, FL1 services operated between Fara Sabina and Fiumicino every 15 minutes.  As some FL1 services originated or terminated in Fara Sabina or Poggio Mirteto, the FL1 trains ran between Fara Sabina and Poggio Mirteto every 30 minutes, and linked Poggio Mirteto and Orte every 60 minutes.

See also 

 History of rail transport in Italy
 List of railway stations in Lazio
 Rail transport in Italy
 Transport in Rome

References

External links
 ATAC – official site 
 ATAC map – schematic depicting all routes in the Rome railway network

This article is based upon a translation of the Italian language version as at September 2012.

Ferrovie regionali del Lazio